In flamenco a tango is one of the flamenco palos closely related in form and feeling to the rumba flamenca. It is often performed as a finale to a flamenco tiento. Its compás and llamada are the same as that of the farruca and share the farruca's lively nature. However, the tango is normally performed in the A Phrygian mode. In some English sources the flamenco tango is written with an -s; "the tangos is..."

The flamenco tango is distinct from the flamenco rumba primarily through the guitar playing.  In Rumba the guitar flows more freely, whereas in Tangos the accents on beats 2, 3 & 4 are marked clearly with heavy strumming.

Tangos is only vaguely related to Argentine tango, and objectively they only share compás binario or double stroke rhythm. The fact that Argentine tango is one of the first couple dances in America has led historians to believe that both could be based in a minuet-style European dance, therefore sharing a common ancestor, while those who compare the present day forms do not see them as related.

Example Lyrics 
Triana, Triana 
qué bonita está Triana, (Triana, how beautiful it is!)
qué bonita esté Triana, que bonita esta Triana
cuando le ponen al puente
la banderita gitana (when we put the gypsy banners on the bridge.)

References

External links 
Get to know the flamenco forms: tangos

Flamenco styles
Spanish dances
Spanish folk music
Spanish music